Simon Dogari , is a Nigerian politician of the People's Democratic Party. He is a former member of the All Progressives Congress. He has also served as Speaker of the Taraba State House of Assembly.

References

Living people
Taraba State Peoples Democratic Party politicians
People from Taraba State
Year of birth missing (living people)
Members of the Taraba State House of Assembly